Edgar E. "Rip" Miller (June 1, 1901 – October 1, 1991) was an American football player, coach, and college athletics administrator.  Miller played college football as a tackle at the University of Notre Dame from 1922 to 1924.  He was a member of the "Seven Mules" line that blocked for the famous "Four Horsemen" backfield on Knute Rockne's national championship team of 1924.  Miller served as the head football coach at the United States Naval Academy from 1931 to 1933, compiling a record of 12–15–2.  After stepping down as head coach, he remained at Navy as line coach until 1947 and then was the assistant athletic director there from 1948 until his retirement in 1974.  Miller was elected to the College Football Hall of Fame as a player in 1966.  Five of his Notre Dame teammates are also enshrined in the Hall of Fame: fellow "Mule", Adam Walsh, and each of the "Four Horsemen", Harry Stuhldreher, Don Miller, Jim Crowley, and Elmer Layden.

Miller died on October 1, 1991.

Head coaching record

References

External links
 
 

1901 births
1991 deaths
American football tackles
Indiana Hoosiers football coaches
Navy Midshipmen athletic directors
Navy Midshipmen football coaches
Notre Dame Fighting Irish football players
College Football Hall of Fame inductees
Sportspeople from Canton, Ohio
Coaches of American football from Ohio
Players of American football from Canton, Ohio